Hirotoshi (written: 弘寿, 弘年, 博敏, 博俊, 裕稔, 浩俊 or 広俊) is a masculine Japanese given name. Notable people with the name include:

, Japanese sumo wrestler
, Japanese samurai
, Japanese businessman
, Japanese baseball player
, Japanese baseball player
, Japanese baseball player
, Japanese baseball player
, Japanese footballer

Japanese masculine given names